Maxima Grupė UAB is a Lithuanian group of retail chain companies operating in Lithuania, Latvia, Estonia, Poland and Bulgaria. It is the largest Lithuanian capital company and the largest employer in the Baltic states. , Maxima has more than 1300 stores in Lithuania, Latvia, Estonia, Poland and Bulgaria. Each store offers between 3,000 and 65,000 brands, depending on the size of the store. The group employs more than 40,000 people. Its main headquarters are in Vilnius, Lithuania.

History 
Three Maxima stores were opened in Vilnius in 1992.

At the end of 2011, Maxima Group bought the Aldik supermarket chain in Poland with 24 stores.

Between 2012 and 2020, Maxima also operated a division in Spain, under the names SuperSol (supermarkets) and Cash Diplo (Cash & Carry). It mainly operated in Madrid and Andalusia. It was acquired in 2012 to the DinoSol group, and SuperSol was sold in 2020 to Carrefour, while Cash Diplo was subject to a corporate takeover in 2021.

In 2019, "Aldik" and "Stokrotka" retail chains are merged and continue to operate under one name, "Stokrotka".

Statistics

Countries with Maxima branches

Maxima LT 
Maxima LT is the largest part of Maxima Group. Maxima stores in Lithuania hold 70% of the total retail market. In 2011, GILD Bankers announced that Maxima Group was the most valuable company. Maxima LT employs 17,484 people (as of July 2016), and operates 237 stores.

Maxima LT CEOs 
 2008–2011: Gintaras Jasinskas
 2011–2014: Arūnas Zimnickas
 2014–2017: Žydrūnas Valkeris
 2017–2020: Kristina Meidė
 2020 present: Jolanta Bivainytė

Maxima Latvija 

On 21 November 2013, the roof of a Maxima XX store in Riga collapsed, killing 54 people and seriously injuring many more. So far it is not known what caused the disaster, but the police are investigating three scenarios: that there was an error in architectural design and authorities overseeing planning had been negligent; that the cause was related to the initial building procedure; and that it was caused by the current construction of the green roof.

Aldik 
Maxima Group operated in Poland under the name of Aldik, to 2018, when these stores started changing to Stokrotka after Maxima Group became main shareholder of Poland's EMPERIA HOLDING S.A. which operates the Stokrotka name.

SuperSol 
The Spanish supermarket chain SuperSol was owned by Maxima between 2012 and 2020. The supermarket had a presence in the Madrid province (including Ávila, Guadalajara and Toledo in the metropolitan area) and Southern Spain (Andalusia, Extremadura, Ceuta and Melilla).

This Spanish arm also included Cash Diplo as a Cash & Carry division. Cash Diplo was subject to a corporate takeover in 2021.

See also 
 List of supermarkets
 List of shopping malls in Lithuania
 Zolitūde shopping centre roof collapse

References

External links 
Maxima Lithuania
Maxima webpage in English

Supermarkets of Lithuania
Supermarkets of Estonia
Supermarkets of Latvia
Supermarkets of Bulgaria
Supermarkets of Spain
Companies based in Vilnius
1992 establishments in Lithuania
Retail companies established in 1992
Lithuanian brands